Ezequiel Vidal may refer to:

 Ezequiel Vidal (footballer, born 1987), Argentine forward for Talleres de Remedios de Escalada
 Ezequiel Vidal (footballer, born 1995), Argentine forward for Club Olimpo